Ronald Johnston (31 December 1930 – 29 July 2014) was a New Zealand speedway rider who rode for the Belle Vue Aces. He also rode in four World Finals (1955, 1957, 1958 and 1960) during his career finishing a best 5th in 1960.

Career
Johnston began riding at the Tahuna Park track in Dunedin in 1949. He moved to England in 1950 and joined the Belle Vue Aces. In his first season, he was at first loaned out to the Belfast Bees and the Sheffield Tigers before establishing himself as a member of the Belle Vue team. He captained the team from 1957 until his retirement at the end of 1961. Under his captaincy Belle Vue won the Britannia Shield three times, and the Daily Mail National Trophy in 1958.

Johnston won the 1952 New Zealand Championship, and he rode for Australasian teams in England and on the continent.

World Final Appearances
 1955  –  London, Wembley Stadium  – 12th  – 6pts
 1957  –  London, Wembley Stadium  – 6th  – 9pts
 1958  –  London, Wembley Stadium  – 8th  – 8pts
 1960  –  London, Wembley Stadium  – 5th  – 10pts

References 

1930 births
2014 deaths
New Zealand speedway riders
Belle Vue Aces riders